Bathhouse Betty is the ninth studio album by the American singer Bette Midler, released in 1998. Bathhouse Betty was Midler's debut album for Warner Bros. Records, after having parted ways with sister label Atlantic Records in 1995 following the moderate commercial success of her later-platinum certified album Bette of Roses. Bathhouse Betty was certified Gold by the RIAA and spawned the Billboard Dance Club chart topper "I'm Beautiful".

Background and production
The title of the album, Bathhouse Betty, refers to Midler's early career when she performed her cabaret shows at gay bathhouses like the Continental Baths in New York which led to her becoming a gay icon with a loyal LGBT following ever since. When Midler promoted the album she said in an interview, "Despite the way things turned out [with the AIDS crisis], I'm still proud of those days [when I got my start singing at the gay bathhouses]. I feel like I was at the forefront of the gay liberation movement, and I hope I did my part to help it move forward. So, I kind of wear the label of 'Bathhouse Betty' with pride."

Released some twenty-five years after Midler's breakthrough with the album The Divine Miss M, Bathhouse Betty was musically a comeback and a return to her roots and her high camp Mae-West-meets-the-Andrews-Sisters stage persona of the same name. The second single "I'm Beautiful"—  a remake of a song by house music group Uncanny Alliance - opens with the spoken line, "This is the Divine Miss M and I'm here to share with you some rare and stimulating insight about my cosmic fabulosity!" and effectively set the tone for the following album.

"Ukulele Lady", a tribute to Midler's native Hawaii which she had first performed live in the 1997 TV special Diva Las Vegas, is an old evergreen written by Gus Kahn and Richard A. Whiting, published in 1925 and first made famous by Vaughn De Leath—and later covered by among others Miss Piggy on The Muppet Show. Other cover versions on Bathhouse Betty include early girl group classics like Patti LaBelle and the Bluebelles' debut single "I Sold My Heart to the Junkman" and 1950's R&B chanteuse Big Maybelle's "One Monkey Don't Stop No Show", the latter featuring swing-rock band Royal Crown Revue.  Contemporary covers include Ben Folds' tragicomic "Boxing", an imagined monologue by Muhammad Ali, originally featured on Ben Folds Five's 1995 self-titled debut album, Dave Frishberg's "I'm Hip" and Dick Gallagher and Mark Waldrop's "Laughing Matters", taken from Howard Crabtree's 1996 gay musical revue When Pigs Fly. "Big Socks", an original written and produced by Chuckii Booker, is a tongue-in-cheek contemporary R&B track whose lyrics debate the supposed correlation between the size of men's feet and other body parts; "Don't brag about your body, baby, and say that you're packin' a lot, 'cause all I see besides your big feet is that you got big socks."

Bathhouse Betty was not all campiness and laughs; the album opens with the ballad "Song of Bernadette" written by Leonard Cohen, Bill Elliott and Jennifer Warnes, and first recorded by Warnes on her 1987 album Famous Blue Raincoat. The title and the lyrics of the song refer to Bernadette Soubirous, a young French girl in the mid-19th century who claimed to have seen the Virgin Mary on several occasions. Bernadette was subsequently declared insane by the villagers of Lourdes, but canonized by the Catholic Church and proclaimed Saint Bernadette after her death. "Lullaby in Blue", which Midler described as her personal favourite on the album, was co-written by Leonard Cohen's son Adam and is a song about a woman who gave up a child for adoption: "I've never heard a pop song about a person who gives their child up and is missing the child... The first time I heard that song, I burst into tears." The first single released from the album was the melancholy "My One True Friend", composed by David Foster, Carole King and Carole Bayer Sager and the lead song from the movie One True Thing which starred Meryl Streep and William Hurt.

One track from the Bathhouse Betty sessions, Julie Gold's "Heaven", was only released as a single B-side and featured as a bonus track on the Japanese edition of the album. Gold had previously written Midler's 1990 hit single "From a Distance".

Critical reception

The album received mixed reviews from music critics. Michael Gallucci from AllMusic website gave the album two out of five stars and wrote that it "tries to be all things to all Bette Midler fans" including "high camp for her loyal, and early, drag cult", "straight-up covers of big-league songwriters, both veteran and modern" and "big, bad ballads for the people who made her a moderately successful Top 40 and box office draw". According to him it lacks personality and is "almost like looking at a photo album filled with vaguely familiar faces, none of which you really know that well." Robert Cristgau gave the album one star and chose "I'm Beautiful" and "Lullabye in Blue" as the best moments of the album.

Commercial performance
Bathhouse Betty reached number 32 on the Billboard 200; "My One True Friend" reached number 16 on the Adult Contemporary chart. "I'm Beautiful", which featured dance remixes by among others Victor Calderone, Danny Tenaglia and composer Brinsley Evans himself, was a major dance-floor hit, becoming a number 1 on the Hot Dance Club Play chart and number 8 on Hot Dance Music/Maxi Singles Sales.

Track listing

Personnel

 Bette Midler – lead vocals, background vocals
 Katreese Barnes – background vocals
 Margaret Dorn – background vocals
 Petra Haden – background vocals
 Ula Hedwig – background vocals
 Natalie Jackson – background vocals  
 Johnny Kemp – background vocals
 Ivan Matias  – background vocals  
 Michelle Matlock – background vocals
 Eddie Nichols – background vocals
 Chuckii Booker – background vocals, multi instruments
 Gregg Bissonette – drums
 Daniel Glass – drums
 Rick Marotta – drums
 Lewis Nash – drums
 John Robinson – drums 
 Steve Schaeffer – drums
 Frank Pagano – percussion
 Emil Richards – percussion
 Richard Crooks – spoons 
 Jerry Barnes – bass guitar, background vocals
 Matt Bissonette – bass
 Nathan East – bass
 Veikko Lepisto – bass   
 Ron Carter – upright bass
 Chuck Domanico – acoustic bass                
 James Achor – guitar
 Dennis Budimir – guitar
 Tim Pierce – guitar
 Michael Thompson – guitar 
 Ira Siegel – guitar, pedal steel  
 Jay Berliner – ukulele
 Eric Weissberg – ukulele
 Brock Walsh – banjo  
 Robbie Kondor – mandolin
 Dean Parks – dulcimer, acoustic guitar, mandolin, balalaika, electric guitar
 Cyrus Chestnut – piano
 Greg Hilfman – piano
 Carole King – piano
 Randy Waldman – piano  
 Kim Bullard – keyboards
 David Foster – keyboards
 Randy Kerber – keyboards
 John Philip Shenale – keyboards
 Steve Skinner – organ, keyboards
 Warren Luening – trumpet
 Jack Sheldon – trumpet
 Scott Steen – trumpet
 Bob Efford – saxophone 
 Richard Mitchell – saxophone 
 Roger Neumann – saxophone
 Mando Dorame – tenor saxophone
 Bill Ungerman – baritone saxophone                   
 Les Benedict – trombone 
 James Self – tuba 
 Richard Todd – French horn

Production

 Arif Mardin – record producer, musical arranger 
 Marc Shaiman – producer, arranger
 David Foster – producer, arranger 
 Ted Templeman – producer
 Chuckii Booker – producer, arranger, engineer 
 Brock Walsh – producer, arranger
 Michael O'Reilly – producer, engineer
 Carole King – arranger 
 Steve Skinner – arranger
 Bill Schneider – arranger
 Bill Ungerman – arranger
 Brad Dechter – arranger
 Kim Bullard – arranger
 Claus Trelby – engineer
 Jason Mauza – engineer 
 Rod Michaels – engineer 
 Alejandro Rodriguez – engineer
 Al Schmitt – engineer
 Lee Herschberg – engineer
 Andy Grassi – engineer 
 Steve Griffen – engineer
 Humberto Gatica – engineer
 Felipe Elgueta – engineer
 Cary Butler – engineer  
 Jeff Hendrickson – engineer, mixing
 Kevin Clark – engineer, mixing
 Dana Jon Chappelle – engineer, mixing 
 David Koenig – mixing
 Frank Filipetti – mixing 
 Gloria Gabriel – production manager      
 Nick Vidar – production assistant
 Dave DePalo – production assistant

Charts

Certifications and sales

References

Bette Midler albums
1998 albums
Albums produced by Arif Mardin
Warner Records albums
Gay bathhouses